The Roman Catholic  Diocese of Colima (erected 11 December 1881) is a suffragan diocese of the Archdiocese of Guadalajara.

On Monday, November 11, 2013, Pope Francis named Bishop Marcelino Hernández Rodríguez, until then the Bishop of the Roman Catholic Diocese of Orizaba (based  in Orizaba, Mexico) as the Bishop of the Roman Catholic Diocese of Colima, replacing the Bishop José Luis Amezcua Melgoza, who submitted his resignation at the age of 75 as is usual.

Territorial losses

Bishops

Ordinaries
Francisco Melitón Vargas y Gutiérrez (1883–1888) 
Francisco de Paula Díaz y Montes (1889–1891) 
Atenógenes Silva y Álvarez Tostado (1892–1900) 
José Amador Velasco y Peña (1903–1949) 
Ignacio de Alba y Hernández (1949–1967) 
Leonardo Viera Contreras (1967–1972) 
Rogelio Sánchez González (1972–1980)
José Fernández Arteaga (1980–1988) 
Gilberto Valbuena Sánchez (1989–2005)
José Luis Amezcua Melgoza (2005–2013) – Bishop Emeritus
Marcelino Hernández Rodríguez (2013–present)

Coadjutor bishop
Ignacio de Alba y Hernández (1939–1949)

Other priest of this diocese who became bishop
Crispin Ojeda Márquez, appointed Auxiliary Bishop of México, Federal District in 2011

Episcopal See
Colima, Colima

External links and references

Colima
Colima, Roman Catholic Diocese of
Colima
Colima
1881 establishments in Mexico